Franklin Parker Reddout (born March 4, 1931) is an American former professional basketball player. Reddout was selected in the 1953 NBA draft by the Rochester Royals after a collegiate career at Syracuse. He played in only seven games and totaled 13 points and 9 rebounds.

References

External links
 Frank Reddout @ OrangeHoops.org

1931 births
Living people
American men's basketball players
Basketball players from New York (state)
Power forwards (basketball)
People from Naples, New York
Rochester Royals draft picks
Rochester Royals players
Syracuse Orange men's basketball players